The 1927 Green Bay Packers season was their ninth season overall and their seventh season in the National Football League. The team finished with a 7–2–1 record under player/coach Curly Lambeau earning them a second-place finish.

Schedule

Standings

References
Sportsencyclopedia.com

Green Bay Packers seasons
Green Bay Packers
Green Bay Packers